Swimming at the 2013 Southeast Asian Games took place at the Wunna Theikdi Aquatics Centre, Naypyidaw, Myanmar from 12 to 16 December 2013. This Aquatics discipline had 32 long course events: 16 for males and 16 for females.

The winning team Singapore collected around a third of overall gold medals in 2013 SEA Games just from swimming competitions.

Event schedule
The 2013 Southeast Asian Games featured a prelims/finals format in all events, save the women's 800 free, 200 backstroke, 400 m I.M., 4x100 Free Relay, 4x200 Free Relay, 4x100 Medley Relay and the men's 1500 free, 4x100 Free Relay, 4x200 Free Relay, 4x100 Medley Relay which were timed final (i.e. all swimmers only swum once). Prelim sessions begin at 9:00 a.m., final sessions begin at 6:00 p.m.

Medalists

Men

Women

Medal table

Records broken

Men

Women

References

 
2013
2013 Southeast Asian Games events
2013 in swimming